Elections to Newport City Council were held on 3 May 2012 along with elections to the other 21 local authorities in Wales, community council elections in Wales and 2012 United Kingdom local elections.

Councillors elected in this election served an extended five-year term, after local government minister Carl Sargeant announced the next elections would be moved from 2016 to 2017 to avoid clashing with the 2016 National Assembly for Wales election which in turn had been delayed a year to avoid clashing with the 2015 United Kingdom general election.

The previous election took place on 1 May 2008.

The next full election took place on 3 May 2017.

Election results: overview

|-bgcolor=#F6F6F6
| colspan=2 style="text-align: right; margin-right: 1em" | Total
| style="text-align: right;" | 50
| colspan=5 |
| style="text-align: right;" |  37,048 
| style="text-align: right;" | 
|-
|}

The Independent statistics are for all Independents, whether they are members of the Independent group on the council or not.

Ward results
Asterisks denote incumbent Councillors seeking re-election.
Vote share changes compared with corresponding 2008 election.

Allt-yr-yn

Alway

Beechwood

Bettws

Noel Trigg was elected as an Independent candidate, having previously been elected as a Labour candidate in the 5 June 2008 by-election.

Caerleon

Gaer

Graig

Langstone

Llanwern

Lliswerry

Malpas

Marshfield

Pillgwenlly

Ringland

Rogerstone

Shaftesbury

St.Julians

Stow Hill

Tredegar Park

Victoria

References

a

Newport
2012